This article focuses on the Burbank, California company. For the general video technique used by Filmlook, Inc. see Film look.
Filmlook, Inc. is a post-production company based in Burbank, California.  Established in 1989, it specializes in a form of image processing used on television programs, commonly known as film look.  The company has won an Emmy Award for its technical achievements.

History
In 1987, company founder Robert Faber began developing the company's process. In 1989, the company was founded and introduced to the industry.

Details
The Filmlook process affects three main features to achieve the appearance of film: motion characteristics, gray scale/contrast, and grain pattern.

Motion characteristics – With some video cameras, you see 60 interlaced pictures per second versus 24 in film. The Filmlook process attempts to replicate the feel of film. Newer digital cameras can shoot at a progressive 24 frames per second.
Greyscale/contrast – Filmlook alters the gray scale, color, and contrast to approximate the typical film characteristic – the "film density curve".
Simulation of grain pattern – A generated grain pattern that can be varied in intensity and attempts to imitate film grain by remaining static for the duration of each (imaginary) film frame (two or three fields).

Background

Invented in 1989, the Filmlook image processing was first used in a test run in a 1991 episode of the ABC sitcom Growing Pains titled "Not With My Carol You Don't". However, the first television series to regularly use Filmlook was Beakman's World, a kid-oriented science series which ran from 1992–1996 on CBS. In 1995, Filmlook was used on the LL Cool J sitcom In the House. However, when the series moved from NBC to UPN in 1996, the series began using unprocessed video.

In recent years, Filmlook has become known for its use on nearly all Disney Channel Original Series made from 2002 to 2008 (except Phil of the Future which was shot on film). That's So Raven, which at one point was the channel's most-watched series, was the first Disney Channel show to use the processing. Since then, four other original series on the channel have had their taped product processed by the company: The Suite Life of Zack and Cody, Hannah Montana, That's So Raven spinoff Cory in the House, Wizards of Waverly Place  and The Suite Life of Zack and Cody spinoff The Suite Life on Deck. Filmlook processing has also been used on segments within the Nickelodeon series The Amanda Show for commercial parodies and the mock teen series Moody's Point.

List of television productions that use/have used Filmlook

American High
American Candidate
Beakman's World (one first-season episode did not go through the process)
Chasing the Sun
Chicken Soup for the Soul
Cory in the House
Cosby – Used primarily on the "street" set during the first season.
Crossed Over – television special
Drake & Josh – used only in season 1, utilized a 'filmized' appearance afterwards
The Doodlebops – Used in most season 1, and half of season 2 episodes.
Endurance† – used from 2005–2008
Founding Brothers – television special
Founding Fathers – television special
The Fresh Prince of Bel-Air – used only in 1 episode, "Viva Lost Wages", only during the Las Vegas scenes
Growing Pains† – used only in 1 episode, "Not With My Carol You Don't"
Hannah Montana (season 1–3)
Haunted Hotels – television special
In the House – used from 1995–1996
It's a Miracle
Kingdom of David
Living Dolls
Making the Band
Maths Mansion
Military Diaries
The Great War and the Shaping of the 20th Century
The Ponderosa
The Power of Play – television special
The Adventures of Jay Jay & Jayime – until "Race To The Power Of Power"
Saturday Night Live
Saved by the Bell – used only in the TV movie Saved by the Bell: Hawaiian Style
Secret Adventures of Jules Verne
So Little Time
Special Forces
SportsCentury
The Amanda Show – segments
The John Larroquette Show
The Suite Life of Zack & Cody
The Suite Life on Deck – season 1
Taina
That's So Raven
The Two Hundredth Anniversary Special on West Point – television special
The City
Unsolved Mysteries
Undressed
Untold Stories of the Navy Seals – television special
Vet School Confidential
World War II: When Lions Roared
Wizards of Waverly Place (seasons 1-2)

†Denotes series that were previously or otherwise broadcast with unprocessed video.

See also
 Filmizing
 24p

References

External links
Official company website
Official company IMDB

Television technology
Film and video technology
Film production companies of the United States
Companies based in Burbank, California
American companies established in 1989